Kosmos 173 ( meaning Cosmos 173), also known as DS-P1-Yu No.8 was a Soviet satellite which was used as a radar calibration target for tests of anti-ballistic missiles. It was a  spacecraft, was built by the Yuzhnoye, and launched in 1967 as part of the Dnepropetrovsk Sputnik programme.

A Kosmos-2I 63SM carrier rocket was used to launch Kosmos 173 from Site 133/1 at Plesetsk Cosmodrome. The launch occurred at 04:59:49 GMT on 24 August 1967, and resulted in Kosmos 173's successful deployment into low Earth orbit.

It remained in orbit until it decayed and reentered the atmosphere on 17 December 1967. It was the ninth of seventy nine DS-P1-Yu satellites to be launched, and the eighth of seventy two to successfully reach orbit.

See also

 1967 in spaceflight

References

Spacecraft launched in 1967
Kosmos 0173
1967 in the Soviet Union
Dnepropetrovsk Sputnik program